100% Pinoy! is a Philippine television informative show broadcast by GMA Network. Originally hosted by Kara David, Raffy Tima, Pia Arcangel, Rhea Santos and Ivan Mayrina, it premiered on July 5, 2006. The show concluded on September 25, 2008. Miriam Quiambao and Joaquin Valdes served as the final hosts.

Hosts

 Kara David 
 Raffy Tima 
 Pia Arcangel 
 Rhea Santos 
 Ivan Mayrina 
 Miriam Quiambao 
 Joaquin Valdes

Accolades

References

External links
 

2006 Philippine television series debuts
2008 Philippine television series endings
Filipino-language television shows
GMA Network original programming
GMA Integrated News and Public Affairs shows
Philippine television shows